Leeno Dee is an Australian-born bassist, singer and songwriter, best known for his major label acts Jerk, Candy Harlots and his current band Dept. of Gloom.

Early life 
Dee was born in Sydney and was bitten by the music bug at the age of 8, when he heard British bands Slade and The Sweet. At 12, he began playing guitar and at 16 switched to bass, which became his main instrument.

Career

Dept. of Gloom 
Dee formed Dept. of Gloom in June 2016 with longtime cohort guitarist Phil Bowley and drummer AJ. In August 2016, the lineup was completed with former Genitorturers guitarist Bizz Tronix.
Following a string of shows, the band entered the studio in March/April 2018 to record their debut EP set for release in the second half of 2018. That EP was postponed, and following COVID-19 the band began recording a full-length debut album, set for a mid/late 2022 release. Dept. of Gloom also opened for American hard rockers Skid Row, Hardcore Superstar and others, and also headlined their own shows.

Melody Black 
In 2010, Dee formed Melody Black who released an album - Love Your Demons - on the RIOT label through Warner Music Group.
The album featured nine songs all composed by Dee. 
In 2012, their cover of The Sweet's classic glam anthem Ballroom Blitz reached the number 1 position on iTunes Chart in Australia.
Melody Black also toured with various acts, including Rose Tattoo and Misfits.

INK 
In 2006, Dee became part of INK along with former Jerk members Charles Cilia and Jonathan Devoy. They released two CDs: Lead...Or Follow and Black Water Reign, and toured extensively, including runs with Deathstars, 69 Eyes and Skid Row.

Jerk 
In 2000, Dee was asked to join industrial metal band Jerk, recording and releasing their debut self-titled EP in 2001.
This led to the band being signed to a worldwide deal with Sony Music. In June, Dee visited Los Angeles where in addition to meeting with several music industry types he attended the Summer Party at Playboy Mansion in Holmby Hills.
Jerk then recorded their debut major label album When Pure Is Defiled, which reached No. 31 on the ARIA Charts and spawned two number 1 Triple J singles, I Hate People Like That and Just What You Need.
The album was produced in Sydney and Los Angeles with both Mark Opitz (INXS, AC/DC, Steelheart) and Sean Beavan (Nine Inch Nails, Marilyn Manson, Guns N' Roses, Slayer, Depeche Mode) at Beavan's Blue Room Studios in L.A.
Jerk toured with Marilyn Manson, Disturbed, Insane Clown Posse, P.O.D. and Killing Joke, amongst others.
The band also made many TV appearances including MTV, Rage, Channel V and others, in addition to a crowd stopping appearance at the ARIA Music Awards in 2003.

Candy Harlots 
Dee's first professional band saw him become the third and final bassist in Candy Harlots.
Following a string of shows including tours with Divinyls, The Angels and AC/DC, and releasing two No. 1 and No. 2 alternative chart singles Red Hot Rocket and Danger, the band signed a deal with Virgin Records. Their album Five Wicked Ways was produced by Peter Blyton (Choirboys). Dee then flew to L.A. for three weeks to oversee the mix sessions with Jeff Hendrickson (Van Halen, Bon Jovi, Joan Jett, Vain). The album spawned two charting singles: The Lady Shakes (No. 17 ARIA) and Sister's Crazy (No. 20 ARIA).

Equipment/Endorsement 
Dee currently plays Rickenbacker 4003S/4000 basses, Tech 21VTB 1969 amplifiers, Markbass CL410 CABS, Korg Pitch-black Rack Tuner Pro, Line 6 (company) Relay G50 Wireless System, GHS (strings).
Previous endorsements include Ashdown amps UK, Markbass amps Italy and RotoSound strings UK.

References

External links
Official Dept. of Gloom Website (http://gloom.band)
Official Dept. of Gloom Facebook Page (https://www.facebook.com/deptofgloom/)
Leeno Dee SoundCloud Page (https://soundcloud.com/leeno-dee-164438296)

Living people
Australian singer-songwriters
Australian bass guitarists
Gothic rock musicians
Musicians from Sydney
Australian rock bass guitarists
Year of birth missing (living people)